The following lists events that happened in 2010 in North Korea.

Incumbents
Premier: Kim Yong-il (until 7 June), Choe Yong-rim (starting 7 June)
Supreme Leader: Kim Jong-il

Events
Bombardment of Yeonpyeong

References

Further reading

 
North Korea
Years of the 21st century in North Korea
2010s in North Korea
North Korea